18th New York Film Critics Circle Awards
January 17, 1953(announced December 29, 1952)

High Noon
The 18th New York Film Critics Circle Awards, honored the best filmmaking of 1952.

Winners
Best Film:
High Noon
Best Actor:
Ralph Richardson - Breaking the Sound Barrier
Best Actress:
Shirley Booth - Come Back, Little Sheba
Best Director:
Fred Zinnemann - High Noon
Best Foreign Language Film:
Forbidden Games (Jeux interdits) • France

References

External links
1952 Awards

1952
New York Film Critics Circle Awards, 1952
1952 in American cinema
1952 in New York City